Pandit Anant Manohar Joshi (8 March 1881 – 12 September 1967), also known as Antubuwa Joshi, was an Indian vocalist of Khayal-genre of Hindustani classical music.

Pandit Antubuwa Joshi was born at Kinhai, near Aundh, in Satara district of Maharashtra, India.

He studied under Gwalior gharana with Balakrishnabuwa Ichalkaranjikar.

His disciples include his son, Gajananrao Joshi, D.R.Nimbargi.

He was awarded Sangeet Natak Akademi Award in 1955, given by the Sangeet Natak Akademi, India's National Academy of Music, Dance & Drama.

References 

1881 births
20th-century Khyal singers
Hindustani singers
Gwalior gharana
Recipients of the Sangeet Natak Akademi Award
1967 deaths
20th-century Indian male classical singers